Events in the year 2015 in Monaco.

Incumbents 
 Monarch: Albert II
 State Minister: Michel Roger

Events 
 January – The twins Princess Gabriella and Prince Jacques were officially presented to the public on the 7th of January.
 25 July – The civil marriage of Pierre Casiraghi, nephew of the Sovereign Prince, and Beatrice Borromeo took place at the Palais Princier, attended by 700 guests and followed by a celebration in the garden of the palace.
 October – Charlotte Casiraghi, niece of the Sovereign Prince, launched Les Rencontres Philosophiques de Monaco, an intellectual 'think tank', discussion forum, and committee for awarding the annual Prix de Philosophie.

Sports 
 2015 Monaco ePrix
 2015 Monaco Grand Prix
 2015 Monte-Carlo Rolex Masters
 2015 Monte Carlo Rally

Deaths 
 14 February – Michele Ferrero, Italian entrepreneur (born 1925)

See also 

 2015 in Europe
 City states

References 

 
Years of the 21st century in Monaco
2010s in Monaco
Monaco
Monaco